Tabone is a surname. Notable people with the surname include:

 Anton Tabone (born 1937), Maltese politician
 Ċensu Tabone (1913–2012), Maltese politician, fourth President of Malta
 Clemente Tabone ( 1575–1665), Maltese landowner and militia member
 Emiliano Tabone (born 1991), Argentine footballer
 John Tabone (born 1980), Maltese swimmer

Maltese-language surnames